Brain Buster Puzzle Pak  known in Japan as ,  is a puzzle video game released for Nintendo DS in Japan, North America, and the PAL region.  The game is a compilation of Nikoli puzzle games including Light Up (called Light On), Slitherlink, Sudoku, Nurikabe, and Kakuro.

Reception

The game received "average" reviews according to the review aggregation website Metacritic. Game Informer gave it a favorable review, about two-and-a-half months before its U.S. release date.

References

External links
 

505 Games games
2006 video games
Nintendo DS games
Nintendo DS-only games
Puzzle video games
Video games developed in Japan
Jaleco games
Single-player video games
Agetec games